Jobas  is a Syrian village located in Saraqib Nahiyah in Idlib District, Idlib.  According to the Syria Central Bureau of Statistics (CBS), Jobas had a population of 2340 in the 2004 census.

Syrian Civil War

During the Syrian Civil War, the town was controlled by the Jihadist Tahrir al-Sham.

In 2020, the town was recaptured by Syrian Army forces during the 'Dawn of Idlib 2' campaign and became a part of the new Idlib frontline.

On 8 August 2022, 3 Uzbek jihadis were killed after carrying out an attack on Syrian Army positions in the town.

References 

Populated places in Idlib District
Villages in Idlib Governorate